The Crunch was an A4 British comic that ran from (issue dates) 20 January 1979 to 26 January 1980 after which it merged with The Hotspur. Its strips included:

Comic strips published in "The Crunch"

 The Kyser Experiment
 Clancy and the Man
 Arena
 The Mantracker
 Hitler Lives
 The Walking Bombs
 Who Killed Cassidy?
 Crag
 Starhawk
 Kill the Hit Man
 The Mill Street Mob
 Space Wars
 Ebony

The Crunch had 32 pages and ran for 54 issues.

See also

List of DC Thomson publications

DC Thomson Comics titles
Comics magazines published in the United Kingdom
Defunct British comics
1979 comics debuts
Magazines established in 1979
Magazines disestablished in 1980